Leonhard Reichartinger (?? – 1396) was a Crusader of Bavarian nobility, who may have come from the vicinity of Trostberg. Reichartinger participated in one of the last great crusades of the Middle Ages, the Battle of Nicopolis. The Nicopolis Crusade was ordered by Sigismund, Holy Roman Emperor and King of Hungary against the Ottoman sultan Bayezid I. Reichartinger was killed in the battle. His death is mentioned in Johann Schiltberger's account of the battle. 

14th-century German nobility
Christians of the Battle of Nicopolis
Bavarian nobility
Military personnel killed in action